"Turn My Back on You" is a song by English band Sade from their third studio album, Stronger Than Pride (1988). It was released as the album's fourth single on 14 November 1988.

Reception
Sophie Heawood of The Guardian commented, "Anchored by a bassline that feels like it could go on for ever, Sade's light touch defines this. Her casualness and distracted ba-ba-bas belie her devotion, but it's all in the details: the crucial pause in the way she sings 'You are my ... religion,' for instance." Frank Guan of Vulture wrote, "Complicated lyrics would only get in the way of that massive bass line. Sade sticks to plain professions of fidelity and leaves it to Paul Denman to carry the day."

Track listings
7-inch single
A. "Turn My Back on You" (re-mix) – 4:11
B. "Keep Looking" – 5:21

12-inch single
A. "Turn My Back on You" (extended re-mix) – 6:09
B1. "Turn My Back on You" (Heff's mix) – 7:06
B2. "Keep Looking" – 5:21

UK and European CD single
"Turn My Back on You" (extended re-mix) – 6:09
"Turn My Back on You" (Heff's mix) – 7:06
"Keep Looking" – 5:21

Charts

References

1988 singles
1988 songs
Epic Records singles
Music videos directed by Sophie Muller
Sade (band) songs
Song recordings produced by Mike Pela
Songs written by Sade (singer)
Songs written by Stuart Matthewman